Fili Seru (born 11 March 1970) is a Fijian rugby footballer who represented Fiji in the 1991 Rugby Union World Cup and the 1995 Rugby League World Cup.

Rugby union career
Seru played rugby union and represented Fiji in ten tests between 1990 and 1993, including at the 1991 Rugby World Cup.

Rugby league career
Seru then switched to rugby league and played for the South Queensland Crushers in 1995, as well as playing in four test matches for Fiji, including three at the 1995 Rugby League World Cup.

He then played for the Illawarra Steelers for two years before moving to England and joining Hull FC.

References

1970 births
Living people
Fijian rugby league players
Fiji national rugby league team players
Dual-code rugby internationals
Fijian rugby union players
Rugby league wingers
Rugby union wings
Fiji international rugby union players
South Queensland Crushers players
Hull F.C. players
Illawarra Steelers players
I-Taukei Fijian people